Cry-Baby is a 1990 American teen musical romantic comedy film written and directed by John Waters. It was the only film of Waters's over which studios were in a bidding war, coming off the heels of the successful Hairspray. The film stars Johnny Depp as 1950s teen rebel "Cry-Baby" Wade Walker, and also features a large ensemble cast that includes Amy Locane, Polly Bergen, Susan Tyrrell, Iggy Pop, Ricki Lake and Traci Lords, with appearances by Troy Donahue, Mink Stole, Joe Dallesandro, Joey Heatherton, David Nelson, Willem Dafoe, and Patricia Hearst.

The film centers on a group of delinquent youth who refer to themselves as "drapes" and their interaction with the rest of the town and its other subculture, the "squares", in 1950s Baltimore, Maryland. "Cry-Baby" Walker, a drape, and Allison, a square, disturb Baltimore society by breaking the subculture taboos and falling in love. The film shows what the young couple has to overcome to be together and how their actions affect the rest of the town.

Part of the film takes place at the now-closed Enchanted Forest amusement park in Ellicott City, Maryland. Others take place in the historic neighborhoods and towns of Hampden, Baltimore City, Reisterstown, Jessup, Milford Mill, and Sykesville, Maryland. The only scenes not filmed in Maryland were shot at Golden Oak Ranch in Santa Clarita Valley, California.

A box office failure during its initial release, the film has subsequently become a cult classic and spawned a Broadway musical of the same name which was nominated for four Tony Awards.

Plot
In 1954 Baltimore, Wade "Cry-Baby" Walker leads a gang of "drapes", which includes his sister Pepper, a teenage mother; facially-disfigured Mona "Hatchet Face" Malnorowski; Wanda Woodward, whose post-World War II normal parents constantly embarrass her; and Milton Hackett, Hatchet Face's devoted boyfriend. Walker's ability to shed a single tear excites all the girls. One day after school, Allison Vernon-Williams, a beautiful girl tired of being a "square", approaches him, and the two fall in love.   That same day, Cry-Baby interrupts a talent show  at the charm school run by Allison's grandmother, and introduces himself to her, who doubts his motives. Cry-Baby invites Allison to a party at Turkey Point, a local hangout spot for the drapes.

Despite her grandmother's skepticism, Allison accompanies Cry-Baby to Turkey Point, where she is given a "drape" makeover by Hatchet Face, Pepper and Wanda, and sings a duet onstage with Cry-Baby. Later, Cry-Baby tells Allison that his father was sent to the electric chair for being the "Alphabet Bomber" – a killer who bombed places in alphabetical order ― along with his mother as an accomplice. Allison tells him that her parents took separate flights for safety, but both planes went down, orphaning her. While they are talking, Allison's jealous square boyfriend, Baldwin, ignites a riot. Cry-Baby is wrongfully blamed for the fight and sent to a penitentiary, outraging all his friends and even Allison's grandmother, who is impressed by Cry-Baby's clear love for Allison. 

When Lenora Frigid, a girl with an unrequited crush on Cry-Baby, claims to be pregnant with his child, Allison feels betrayed and returns to Baldwin and the squares, though her grandmother warns her against rushing into a decision.  Meanwhile, in the penitentiary, Cry-Baby gets a teardrop tattoo from fellow drape Dupree (Robert Tyree), telling him, "I've been hurt all my life, but real tears wash away. This one's for Allison, and I want it to last forever!"

Eventually, after performing with Baldwin and the Whiffles at a new theme park, Allison is persuaded by the newly established alliance between the Drapes and her grandmother to stand by Cry-Baby and join the campaign for his release. She goes to sing in front of the jail with the other drapes. Their performance persuades the judge to release Cry-Baby. Baldwin immediately insults him, revealing that his grandfather electrocuted Cry-Baby's father and that his family laughs about that. Cry-Baby challenges him to a chicken race.  Cry-Baby wins, as Baldwin chickens out, and is reunited with Allison. During the race, Pepper gives birth to a baby in the backseat, and her boyfriend proposes by holding up a sign.

The film ends with all watching the chicken race crying a single tear, except for Allison and Cry-Baby, who has finally let go of the past, enabling him to cry from both eyes.

Cast

Musical numbers
 "Women in Cadillacs" – Doc Starkes and The Night Riders *(sung along)* – Cry-Baby
 "Gee" – The Crows *(sung along)* – Cry-Baby, Hatchet-Face, Milton, Pepper, Wanda
 "Sh-Boom" – Baldwin, the Whiffles
 "A Teenage Prayer" – Allison
 "King Cry-Baby" – Cry-Baby, Allison, Hatchet-Face, Milton, Pepper, Wanda
 "Teardrops Are Falling" – Cry-Baby, Dupree, Prisoners
 "Doin' Time for Bein' Young" – Cry-Baby, Prisoners
 "The Naughty Lady of Shady Lane" (Director's Cut) – Baldwin, the Whiffles
 "Mr. Sandman" – Allison, Baldwin, the Whiffles
 "Please, Mr. Jailer" – Allison, Cry-Baby, Company, Prisoners
 "Chicken" (deleted scene) – Baldwin, the Whiffles
 "High School Hellcats" – Cry-Baby, Allison, Pepper, Company

Release
Cry-Baby premiered in Baltimore on March 14, 1990, and was released on April 6. It was screened out of competition at the 1990 Cannes Film Festival.

Critical reception
The film received positive reviews from critics. On Rotten Tomatoes, it currently holds a 72% score, based on 58 reviews, with an average rating of 6.6/10. The site's consensus states: "John Waters' musical ode to the teen rebel genre is infectious and gleefully camp, providing star Johnny Depp with the perfect vehicle in which to lampoon his pin-up image." Roger Ebert of the Chicago Sun-Times awarded the film 3 out of 4 stars. Metacritic calculated an average score of 63 out of 100 based on 22 reviews, indicating "generally favorable reviews". Audiences polled by CinemaScore gave the film an average grade of "B-" on an A+ to F scale.

Box office
The film opened on April 6, 1990 in 1,229 North American cinemas — an unprecedented number for a John Waters film. In its opening weekend, it grossed a soft $3,004,905 ($2,445 per screen) and grossed $8,266,343 by the end of its theatrical run, making it a box office flop from its $12 million budget.

Musical adaptation

Cry-Baby is the second of Waters' films to be adapted for the stage as a musical comedy (following Hairspray).

References

External links

 
 
 
 

1990 films
1990s English-language films
1990s romantic musical films
1990s musical comedy films
1990 romantic comedy films
American musical comedy films
American romantic comedy films
American romantic musical films
American satirical films
American teen comedy films
American teen romance films
Films scored by Patrick Williams
Films about dysfunctional families
Films about race and ethnicity
Films adapted into plays
Films directed by John Waters
Films set in 1954
Films set in Baltimore
Films shot in Baltimore
American gang films
Rockabilly
Imagine Entertainment films
Universal Pictures films
1990s American films